Kitasamycin (INN) is a macrolide antibiotic. It is produced by Streptomyces kitasatoensis. The drug has antimicrobial activity against a wide spectrum of pathogens. There are several generic names of this drug such as:
 Kitasamycin (OS: BAN, JAN, USAN)
 Kitasamycine (OS: DCF)
 C 637 (IS)
 Katasamycin (IS)
 Leucomycin (IS)
 Kitasamycin (PH: JP XV)
 Kitasamycin Acetate (OS: JAN)
 Leucomycin Acetate (IS)
 Kitasamycin Acetate (PH: JP XV)
 Kitasamycin Tartrate (OS: JAN)
 Leucomycin Tartrate (IS)
 Kitasamycin Tartrate (PH: JP XV)

References 

Macrolide antibiotics